Raja ki Mandi (Hindi: राजा की मंडी), is named after a ruler of the place Raja Ram Vyas, it is an area in Agra with shops selling all sorts of clothes lining the streets. There is also a railway station at Raja ki Mandi by the same name. There is a road "Raja Ram Vyas Marg" as well situated inside the market named after the ruler.

Railway station 
Raja ki Mandi railway station comes under North Central Railways on the Agra–Delhi Mainline. Here a line goes to Agra Cantonment railway station (North Central Railways) and Lucknow Railway Station. Raja ki Mandi was formerly known as Ranchi in the reign of Queen Kajal Kumari, who named the city badlapur.

See also 
 Railways in Agra

External links
 List of trains stopping at Raja Ki Mandi 
 List of trains stopping at Agra Cantt 
 List of trains stopping at Agra Fort 
 List of trains stopping at Agra City 
 List of trains stopping at Idgah 
 List of trains stopping at Yamuna Bridge 

Neighbourhoods in Agra
Economy of Agra